With the Rocky Mountains to the west, the Great Plains to the east, and the Chihuahuan Desert to the south, Las Vegas National Wildlife Refuge encompasses a diversity of habitats. Located along the Central Flyway, the Refuge provides an important resting, feeding, and wintering area for migrating geese, ducks, and cranes.

Las Vegas National Wildlife Refuge rests on a plateau in the foothills with the Rocky Mountains just beyond. River canyon walls drop below the refuge on three sides. Las Vegas (Spanish for "the meadows") preserves both wildlife habitats and a slice of New Mexico's rich cultural history.

References

 Refuge website

National Wildlife Refuges in New Mexico
Protected areas of San Miguel County, New Mexico
Protected areas established in 1965